Yocon may refer to:
 Yocón, municipality in Honduras
 Yohimbine, by the trade name Yocon